Enock Kwakwa (born 2 July 1994) is a Ghanaian footballer who currently plays for Northern Colorado Hailstorm in the USL League One.

Career

Manchester City
Kwakwa was signed by English club Manchester City in August 2012, and immediately loaned out to Norwegian Tippeligaen club Strømsgodset IF.

Strømsgodset
Kwakwa arrived at Strømsgodset in September 2012, alongside fellow Right To Dream Academy graduate Bismark Adjei-Boateng. He spent the final months of the 2012 season on the reserves team in the Second Division, and impressed, in particular with a great goal from 40 meters. Unfortunately, he was injured in the 2013 pre-season, and had to train alternatively for four weeks. He made his debut on 13 April 2013, when he played the last 6 minutes in the match against Vålerenga. Unfortunately, he was injured again in June 2013, when he tore a tendon in his thigh. He never played for the first team again during the loan spell, and returned to the English club when he was unable to renew his work permit.

TPS
He was loaned out to Finnish club TPS in September 2013, but only played one reserve match before the loan deal was canceled.

Ullensaker/Kisa
On 17 March 2014, he signed a permanent deal with Norwegian First Division club Ull/Kisa, lasting until December 2015. He made his debut for the club on 16 May 2014 in a match against Bryne, and played a total of 17 matches for the club in the 2014 season, scoring 3 goals. After the team was relegated, the player was able to leave the club on a free transfer.

Falkenbergs FF
On 24 February 2015, Kwakwa signed a short-term deal lasting until 30 June the same year with the Swedish Allsvenskan team Falkenbergs FF, with an option to extend the contract for another three years if the player impresses.

Jönköpings Södra IF
Jönköpings Södra IF announced on 20 November 2018, that they had signed Kwakwa for the 2019 season.

Charleston Battery
On 18 March 2022, Kwakwa moved to USL Championship side Charleston Battery who compete in the second-tier of US soccer. Kwakwa scored his first goal with the club on 16 July 2022 in a 3-1 home victory over Hartford Athletic. Following the 2022 season, Kwakwa was released by Charleston.

Northern Colorado Hailstorm
On 30 January 2023, Kwakwa signed with USL League One side Northern Colorado Hailstorm.

References

1994 births
Living people
Ghanaian footballers
Ghanaian expatriate footballers
Manchester City F.C. players
Strømsgodset Toppfotball players
Ullensaker/Kisa IL players
Falkenbergs FF players
Jönköpings Södra IF players
Charleston Battery players
Northern Colorado Hailstorm FC players
Right to Dream Academy players
Expatriate footballers in England
Expatriate footballers in Norway
Expatriate footballers in Sweden
Expatriate soccer players in the United States
Eliteserien players
Norwegian First Division players
Allsvenskan players
Superettan players
Ghanaian expatriate sportspeople in England
Ghanaian expatriate sportspeople in Norway
Ghanaian expatriate sportspeople in Sweden
Ghanaian expatriate sportspeople in the United States
Association football midfielders
USL Championship players